Lucien Stryk (April 7, 1924 - January 24, 2013) was an American poet, translator of Buddhist literature and Zen poetry, and former English professor at Northern Illinois University (NIU).

Biography

Stryk was born in Poland on April 7, 1924, and moved to Chicago aged four, where he spent the remainder of his childhood.   He later served as a Forward Observer during World War II in the Pacific.  On his return, he studied at Indiana University, and afterwards at the Sorbonne in Paris, London University, and the University of Iowa Writing Program.

From 1958 until his retirement in 1991 Lucien Stryk served on the Northern Illinois University English department faculty. In 1991 NIU awarded him an honorary doctorate for his accomplishments. He also has taught at universities in Japan, and was a Fulbright lecturer both in Japan and in Iran.

Stryk wrote or edited more than two dozen books. These include his own poetry, poetry anthologies and numerous translations of Chinese and Japanese Zen poetry, both classical and contemporary. He also recorded much of his work on Folkways Records. His poetry was influenced by Walt Whitman, Paul Éluard, and Basho, and translated into Japanese, Chinese, French, Spanish, Swedish and Italian.

Lucien Stryk twice received the Illinois Arts Council Artist's Grant, and twice the Illinois Arts Council Literary Award.  He edited two seminal volumes of Midwestern poetry, Heartland I and Heartland II, which put the Midwest on the literary map.  Lucien's sequential portrait of the city, "A Sheaf for Chicago," was first published in Chicago as part of a "Best New Poem" competition shared with John Berryman and Hayden Carruth.  That same poem was recently reprinted in the anthology, City of the Big Shoulders: Poems about Chicago (University of Iowa Press, 2012).

In 2009, the American Literary Translators Association (ALTA) announced the inaugural Lucien Stryk Asian Translation Prizes.

Lucien Stryk died January 24, 2013, at St. John's Hospice in London. He is buried in Highgate Cemetery.  Lucien Stryk is survived by his wife, Helen; sister, Leonora Krimen; son, Dan Stryk and his wife Suzanne; daughter, Lydia Stryk.

Poetry

 Taproot, Fantasy Press, 1953
 The Trespasser, Fantasy Press, 1956
 Notes for a Guidebook, (The New Poetry Series) AMS Press
 Heartland: Poets of the Midwest, (editor) Northern Illinois University Press, 1967
 The Pit and Other Poems, Swallow Press, 1969
 Awakening, Swallow Press, 1973
 Heartland II: Poets of the Midwest, (editor) Northern Illinois University Press, 1975
 Selected Poems, Swallow Press, 1976
 The Duckpond, Omphalos Press, 1978
 Prairie voices: a collection of Illinois poets, Spoon River Poetry Press, 1980, 
 Willows, Embers Handpress, 1983
 Collected Poems, 1958-1983, Swallow Press, 1984
 Bells of Lombardy, Northern Illinois University Press, 1986, 
 Of Pen & Ink & Paper Scraps, Swallow Press/Ohio University Press, 1989
 And Still Birds Sing : New & Collected Poems, Swallow Press/Ohio University Press, 1998, 
 Where We Are: Selected Poems and Translations, Skoob Books, 1997

Selected non-fiction and works of translation
 Zen: Poems, Prayers, Sermons, Anecdotes, Interviews, Doubleday and Co, 1963, reissue: Ohio University Press, 1981
   (reprint Grove Press, 1994)
 Afterimages: Zen Poems of Shinkichi Takahashi, Swallow Press, 1970
 
 The Duckweed Way: Haiku of Issa, Translators Lucien Stryk, Takashi Ikemoto, Rook Press, 1977
 
 Encounter with Zen: Writings on Poetry and Zen, Swallow Press, 1981
 
 On Love and Barley: Haiku of Basho, Penguin, 1985
 
 Bird of time: Haiku of Basho
 The Dumpling Field: Haiku of Issa, Translator Lucien Stryk, Ohio University Press, 1991
 
 Lucien Stryk (ed) Cage Of Fireflies : Modern Japanese Haiku, Swallow Press, 1993, 
 The Awakened Self: Encounters With Zen, Kodansha International, 1995,

About Stryk
 Zen, Poetry, the Art of Lucien Stryk.  Susan Azar Porterfield, ed.  Ohio University Press, 1993.
 Interview with Stryk 'Poets & Writers' July/August 1995.
 Susan Azar Porterfield, "The War Poetry of Lucien Stryk."  Journal of the Midwest Modern Language Association Winter 2001
 Susan Azar Porterfield, "Thomas James and Lucien Stryk: "and you/My first live poet."  The Writer's Chronicle'' Oct. 2013

References

External links

Stryk Discography at Smithsonian Folkways
"Lucien Stryk", PoetryPoetry
short note on Stryk
Northern Illinois University's Statement On His Death

American male poets
Literary critics of English
American academics of English literature
2013 deaths
1924 births
Burials at Highgate Cemetery
20th-century American poets
20th-century American translators
20th-century American male writers
20th-century American non-fiction writers
American male non-fiction writers
Polish emigrants to the United States